The 1919 Arizona Wildcats football team represented the University of Arizona as an independent during the 1919 college football season. In their fifth season under head coach Pop McKale, the Wildcats compiled a 7–1 record, shut out seven of eight opponents (albeit one game by claim of forfeit), and outscored all opponents, 253 to 19. In the fifth meeting in what later became the Arizona–Arizona State football rivalry, Arizona defeated the Tempe Normal Owls by a 59–0 score.

The team's roster included Louis "Slonnie" Sloaaker (quarterback), "Gyp" Manzo and Aaron McCreary (halfbacks), John Hobbs (fullback), Billie Wofford and Tommy Marlar (ends), Big Dick Smith and Howard Barkley (guards), George Hardaway and Oscar Cook (tackles), and the team captain Emzy Harvey "Swede" Lynch (center).

Schedule

References

Arizona
Arizona Wildcats football seasons
Arizona Wildcats football